The 2018–19 Rugby Europe Conference is the third-level rugby union competition below the premier Championship and Trophy competitions. It is the third Conference under its new format. After Lithuania was promoted to the Trophy and Moldova relegated at the end of the 2017–18 season, Bosnia and Herzegovina, Croatia, Cyprus, Hungary, Israel, Luxembourg, Malta, Moldova, Sweden and Ukraine compete for the Conference 1 title. While after the relegation of Estonia and the promotion of Bulgaria, Andorra, Austria, Bulgaria, Denmark, Finland, Latvia, Norway, Serbia, Slovakia and Slovenia will compete for the Conference 2 title. Due to the relegation of a Conference 2 North team and the promotion of a Southern team, the Conference 2 Pools had to be reallocated. While Bulgaria joined the Conference 2 South, Austria switched pools to the Conference 2 North, replacing Estonia.

The winners of Conference 1 North and South will play an additional match, a Conference 1-Trophy Promotion play-off for the right to play the 2019–20 Rugby Europe Trophy. While the bottom placed teams of Conference 1 North and South will be relegated to Conference 2 for the following season, replacing the North and South winners of Conference 2. The bottom placed team with the worse overall record will be relegated and participate in the 2019 Rugby Europe Development season.

Ukraine was directly promoted to 2019–20 Rugby Europe Trophy, because Malta was not able to play the Conference 1-Trophy Promotion play-off game.

Conference 1

North

Table

Fixtures

South

Table

Fixtures

Conference 2

North

Table

Fixtures

South

Table

Fixtures

See also
 Rugby Europe International Championships
 2018–19 Rugby Europe International Championships
 Six Nations Championship

References

2018–19 Rugby Europe International Championships
2018-19